Karla Irene van der Boon (born 9 October 1968 in Zaandam, North Holland) is a retired water polo goalkeeper from the Netherlands, who after her marriage became known as Karla Plugge. She made her debut for the Women's National Team in 1991, and was on the squad that won the gold medal at the 1991 World Championship in Perth, Australia. 

Van der Boon competed for her native country at the 2000 Summer Olympics in Sydney, Australia, finishing in fourth place. Her biggest success came in 1991, when the Dutch won the world title, defeating Canada in the final.

See also
 Netherlands women's Olympic water polo team records and statistics
 List of women's Olympic water polo tournament goalkeepers
 List of world champions in women's water polo
 List of World Aquatics Championships medalists in water polo

References

External links
 

1968 births
Living people
Sportspeople from Zaanstad
Dutch female water polo players
Water polo goalkeepers
Olympic water polo players of the Netherlands
Water polo players at the 2000 Summer Olympics
World Aquatics Championships medalists in water polo
20th-century Dutch women
21st-century Dutch women